Nawab Sir Muhammad Jalaluddin Khan  (2 April 1889 – 4 December 1936) was the Nawab of Radhanpur, in British India. He married his first cousin Bima Husen Bakte, (died 1916),  and 2ndly married Shah Begum Saheba, daughter of Sardar Sahib Khan Muhammed Khan of Amritsar, and had issue. He died 4 December 1936 and was succeeded by a cousin.

1889 births
1936 deaths
Indian Muslims
Nawabs of India
Knights Commander of the Order of the Indian Empire